Basic aromatic rings are aromatic rings in which the lone pair of electrons of a ring-nitrogen atom is not part of the aromatic system and extends in the plane of the ring.  This lone pair is responsible for the basicity of these nitrogenous bases, similar to the nitrogen atom in amines.   In these compounds the nitrogen atom is not connected to a hydrogen atom. Basic aromatic compounds get protonated and form aromatic cations (e.g. pyridinium) under acidic conditions.   Typical examples of basic aromatic rings are pyridine or quinoline.  Several rings contain basic as well as non-basic nitrogen atoms, e.g. imidazole and purine.

In non-basic aromatic rings the lone pair of electrons of the nitrogen atom is delocalized and contributes to the aromatic pi electron system. In these compounds the nitrogen atom is connected to a hydrogen atom. Examples of non-basic nitrogen-containing aromatic rings are pyrrole and indole. Pyrrole contains a lone pair that is part of the pi-conjugated system, so it is not available to deprotonate an acidic proton.

The basic aromatic rings purines and pyrimidines are nucleobases found in DNA and RNA.

References

See also
 Simple aromatic ring

Nitrogen heterocycles